The Goulburn subregion is part of the Hume region in north eastern Victoria. 
It includes the municipalities of City of Greater Shepparton, Shire of Mitchell, Shire of Moira, Shire of Murrindindi, Shire of Strathbogie

References